Marina Dmitrović (born 23 March 1985) is a Serbian handballer for Dunărea Brăila.

International honours 
EHF Champions League:
Bronze Medalist: 2014
World Championship:
Finalist: 2013

References

External links
EHF Profile

Living people
1985 births
Serbian female handball players
Handball players from Belgrade
Expatriate handball players in Turkey
Serbian expatriate sportspeople in Turkey
Serbian expatriate sportspeople in Hungary
Serbian expatriate sportspeople in Romania
Serbian expatriate sportspeople in North Macedonia
Yenimahalle Bld. SK (women's handball) players